Juliana Ojoshogu Negedu (born 31 July 1979 in Kaduna) is a Nigerian women's basketball player. A member of the Nigeria women's national basketball team at the 2004 Summer Olympics, Negedu scored 8 points in 5 games.

References

1979 births
Living people
Nigerian women's basketball players
Olympic basketball players of Nigeria
Basketball players at the 2004 Summer Olympics
Sportspeople from Kaduna
African Games gold medalists for Nigeria
African Games medalists in basketball
Competitors at the 2003 All-Africa Games